A National Wildlife Area is a conservation designation for a geographical region in Canada that restricts most human activities on that region. However, land use permits may be issued "for activities that are compatible with conservation". Such areas are established and managed by the Canadian Wildlife Service, a division of Environment and Climate Change Canada.

Protections
Each National Wildlife Area involves a management plan which specifies activities which are generally allowed within the protected area, as well as activities requiring permits. Under the Wildlife Area Regulations, traditional, personal and recreational activities such as hunting, fishing, or canoeing are allowed, whereas resource extraction or livestock grazing would be permitted only under the authority of a yearly permit with strict limits. Some National Wildlife Area in the territories, such as Polar Bear Pass, require co-management between federal government agencies and the Inuit, per the Nunavut Land Claims Agreement.

List of National Wildlife Areas in Canada
This is a list of National Wildlife Areas in Canada by province. It uses data from Environment and Climate Change Canada.

Alberta
 
 Blue Quills National Wildlife Area, 
 Meanook National Wildlife Area, 
 Spiers Lake National Wildlife Area, 
 Suffield National Wildlife Area,

British Columbia

 Alaksen National Wildlife Area, 
 Columbia National Wildlife Area, 
 Qualicum National Wildlife Area, 
 Scott Islands Marine National Wildlife Area, 
 Vaseux-Bighorn National Wildlife Area, 
 Widgeon Valley National Wildlife Area,

Manitoba

 Pope National Wildlife Area, 
 Rockwood National Wildlife Area,

New Brunswick

 ,  — Cape Jourimain
 , 
 , 
 ,  — Riverside-Albert
 Tintamarre National Wildlife Area,

Nova Scotia

 Boot Island National Wildlife Area, 
 Chignecto National Wildlife Area, 
 John Lusby National Wildlife Area, 
 , 
 , 
 Wallace Bay National Wildlife Area,

Nunavut

 , 
 , 
 Nirjutiqavvik National Wildlife Area, 
 Polar Bear Pass National Wildlife Area, 
 ,

Ontario

 Big Creek National Wildlife Area, 
 Eleanor Island National Wildlife Area, 
 , 
 Mississippi Lake National Wildlife Area, 
 Mohawk Island National Wildlife Area, 
 Prince Edward Point National Wildlife Area, 
 Scotch Bonnet Island National Wildlife Area, 
 St. Clair National Wildlife Area, 
 Wellers Bay National Wildlife Area, 
 Wye Marsh National Wildlife Area,

Quebec

 , 
 Cap Tourmente National Wildlife Area, 
 , 
 , 
 , 
 , 
 , 
 ,

Saskatchewan

 Bradwell National Wildlife Area, 
 Last Mountain Lake National Wildlife Area, 
 Prairie National Wildlife Area, 
 Raven Island National Wildlife Area, 
 St. Denis National Wildlife Area, 
 Stalwart National Wildlife Area, 
 Tway National Wildlife Area, 
 Webb National Wildlife Area,

Yukon

 Nisutlin River Delta National Wildlife Area,

See also
 List of Migratory Bird Sanctuaries of Canada

References

 
Nature conservation in Canada
National Wildlife Areas
National Wildlife Areas